Eidet is Norwegian for isthmus.  The name may refer to many places in Norway:

Eide, Bø, a village in Bø municipality in Nordland county (also called Eidet)
Eide, Nordland, a village in Tysfjord municipality in Nordland county
Eidet, Lierne, a village in Lierne municipality in Trøndelag county
Eidet, Hemne, a village in Hemne municipality in Trøndelag county
Eidet, Troms, a village in Måselv municipality in Troms county

See also
Eide (disambiguation)